The Canton of Bulgnéville is a French former administrative and electoral grouping of communes in the Vosges département of eastern France and in the region of Lorraine. It was disbanded following the French canton reorganisation which came into effect in March 2015. It consisted of 12 communes, which joined the canton of Vittel in 2015. It had 5,777 inhabitants (2012).

Positioned within the Arrondissement of Neufchâteau, the canton had its administrative centre at Bulgnéville.

Composition
The Canton of Bulgnéville comprised the following 24 communes:

Aingeville
Aulnois
Auzainvilliers
Belmont-sur-Vair
Bulgnéville
Crainvilliers
Dombrot-sur-Vair
Gendreville
Hagnéville-et-Roncourt
La Vacheresse-et-la-Rouillie
Malaincourt
Mandres-sur-Vair
Médonville
Morville
Norroy
Parey-sous-Montfort
Saint-Ouen-lès-Parey
Saint-Remimont
Saulxures-lès-Bulgnéville
Sauville
Suriauville
Urville
Vaudoncourt
Vrécourt

References

Bulgneville
2015 disestablishments in France
States and territories disestablished in 2015